This is a list of Spanish television related events in 1972.

Events
 24 April: The best known Quiz Show in Spanish Television history debuts at La 1: Un, dos, tres... responda otra vez, directed by Narciso Ibáñez Serrador.
 18 September - Debut of the first colour TV program in Spain, the music show Divertido siglo, by Fernando García de la Vega.
 13 December: La 1 broadcasts La cabina, directed by Antonio Mercero and starred by José Luis López Vázquez, awarded by the International Emmy and Golden Nymph in the Monte-Carlo Television Festival.

Debuts

La 1

Television shows

La 1

Ending this year

La 1

Foreign series debuts in Spain

La 1

Births
 7 March - Nathalie Poza, actress.
 23 March - Nuria Roca, hostess.
 9 April - Carmen Alcayde, hostess.
 10 April - Toni Acosta, actress.
 13 May - María José Molina, hostess.
 21 May - Arancha del Sol, hostess.
 2 June - Mariano Alameda, actor.
 25 June - Albert Barniol , meteorologist.
 10 July - Alicia Bogo, actress.
 3 August - Adrià Collado, actor.
 7 August - Eva Hache, comedian and hostess.
 27 August - Patricia Vico, actress.
 3 September - Natalia Estrada, hostess.
 15 September - Letizia Ortiz, hostess, incumbent Queen of Spain
 9 November - Florentino Fernández, comedian and host.
 Javier Martín, host.

See also
1972 in Spain
List of Spanish films of 1972

References 

1972 in Spanish television